All the Little Animals is a 1998 drama film directed and produced by Jeremy Thomas and starring  Christian Bale and John Hurt. Based on the 1968 novella of the same name by Walker Hamilton, it was adapted for the screen by Eski Thomas.

The film screened in the Un Certain Regard section at the 1998 Cannes Film Festival. It was released in the United States on 3 September 1999.

Plot
The story centers on an emotionally challenged man named Bobby (Christian Bale). He runs away from home in order to escape his abusive stepfather (Daniel Benzali), nicknamed "The Fat", who had killed Bobby's pet mouse and, as Bobby puts it, screamed at his mother until she died as a result. He finds himself in woodlands near Cornwall in England, eventually meeting an old man after being involved in a car accident (John Hurt). Mr. Summers, as the man calls himself, spends his time traveling and giving burials to animals that have been killed by cars, a task he refers to as "The Work". Bobby, also having an affinity for animals, becomes friends with the old man and aids him in his task.

Eventually, the pair return to London to confront "The Fat".

Cast
John Hurt as Mr. Summers
Christian Bale as Bobby Platt
John Higgins as Dean
Daniel Benzali as Bernard 'The Fat' De Winter
James Faulkner as Mr. Stuart Whiteside
John O'Toole as Lorry Driver
Amanda Boyle as Des
Amy Robbins as Valerie Ann Platt, Bobby's Mother
Kaye Griffiths as Lepidopterist
Sevilla Delofski as Janet, De Winter's Secretary
Helen Kluger as Ice Cream Vendor
Shane Barks as Young Bobby
Sjoerd Broeks as Mark
Elizabeth Earl as Child in Van
Andrew Dixon as Philip

Background
Jeremy Thomas, by then an Academy Award-winning producer, later remembered his journey to becoming a director:

References

External links

 

1998 films
1998 drama films
British drama films
1990s English-language films
Films based on British novels
Films directed by Jeremy Thomas
Lionsgate films
Films produced by Jeremy Thomas
1990s British films